Sun Shu-may (born 9 January 1981) is a Taiwanese pop singer, actress and TV host who sings predominantly in Taiwanese Hokkien. She has released 17 albums since 1995.

Sun won Golden Melody Award for Best Hokkien pop female artist in 2005, and was a finalist for the award in 2003, 2004, 2006, 2008, 2011, 2014, and 2015.

External links

1981 births
Living people
Taiwanese Hokkien pop singers
Actresses from Kaohsiung
Taiwanese television actresses
21st-century Taiwanese actresses
Musicians from Kaohsiung
20th-century Taiwanese women singers
21st-century Taiwanese women singers